The Library of Congress bimetallic eagle is a modern U.S. commemorative coin issued in the ten dollar denomination. It is the first gold and platinum bimetallic coin to be issued by the United States Mint. It was issued in proof and business strike qualities.

The issue price was $425 for the proof version and $405 for the uncirculated (business strike) version.

Design
The bimetallic coin design was inspired by the graceful architecture of the library's Jefferson Building. The outer ring is stamped from a sheet of gold, then a solid core of platinum is placed within the ring. Then, the gold ring and platinum core are simultaneously stamped forming an annular bead where the two precious metals meet. The obverse depicts the hand of Minerva, the Goddess of Wisdom, raising the torch of learning aside the dome of the Thomas Jefferson Building. The coin's reverse is marked with the Library of Congress seal encircled by a laurel wreath, symbolizing its national accomplishment.

Specifications
Mintage (max.): 200,000 (all options). The final mintages were 7,261 uncirculated, and 27,445 proof.

U.S. Mint Facility: West Point, NY

Public Law: 105-268

See also

United States commemorative coins
Library of Congress silver dollar
 List of United States commemorative coins and medals (2000s)

References

External links
 Original press release
US Mint Special Programs page
US Mint Coin Library

Currencies introduced in 1999
Modern United States commemorative coins
Bi-metallic coins
Library of Congress
Eagles on coins